René Berndt (born 26 May 1983) is a German darts player, currently playing in Professional Darts Corporation events.

Berndt has qualified for numerous PDC European Tour events since 2016, but not gone past the second round in any of them.

References

External links

Living people
German darts players
Professional Darts Corporation associate players
1983 births
Sportspeople from Bremen